Juan José Cancel Ríos (August 20, 1925 – August 26, 1992) was a Puerto Rican politician and lawyer who served as the 7th President of the Senate of Puerto Rico from 1973 to 1976.

Biography
Juan Cancel Ríos was born on August 20, 1925 in Barceloneta, Puerto Rico. His parents were Juan Cancel Matos and Salustiana Ríos. Cancel Ríos studied his elementary at Rafael Balseiro Maceira Elementary School in Barceloneta, graduating in 1940. He then went to José Severo Quiñonez High School in Manatí, graduating in 1944. He then went to study at the University of Puerto Rico, but after his first year, enrolled with the United States Army to serve during World War II. In 1947, he was honorably discharged by the Army and he returned to the University, graduating in 1953 with two degrees: Social Science and Law at the University of Puerto Rico School of Law . After passing the bar exam, he became an attorney.

Cancel showed interest in politics since his youth. From 1957 to 1960, he presided the Municipal Assembly of Barceloneta. In 1960, he was elected as a member of the Puerto Rico House of Representatives for the District of Manatí-Barceloneta. He served in that position from 1961 to 1964.

In 1964, Cancel was elected to the Senate of Puerto Rico for the District of Arecibo. He was reelected in 1968 and 1972. In 1973, his fellow senators chose him as President of the Senate. He did so until 1976.

Cancel was also a member of the Board of the Attorney's College, the Lions Club of Manatí, the American Legion, and other civic organizations. After retiring from politics, Cancel presided the Puerto Rico Baseball League.

Cancel Ríos was married to Carmen Leticia Alegría Estela, and they had three children together: Carmencita, María Magdalena and Juan Andrés. Cancel Ríos died on August 26, 1992 in San Juan, Puerto Rico.

The Barceloneta Government Center is named after him.

See also

List of Puerto Ricans
Senate of Puerto Rico

References

External links
Juan Cancel Biography
Personas Ilustres de Barceloneta

Members of the Senate of Puerto Rico
1925 births
1992 deaths
People from Barceloneta, Puerto Rico
Presidents of the Senate of Puerto Rico
Presidents pro tempore of the Senate of Puerto Rico
United States Army soldiers
University of Puerto Rico alumni
20th-century American politicians
United States Army personnel of World War II